Sulser is a surname. Notable people with the surname include:

Beau Sulser (born 1994), American baseball player
Claudio Sulser (born 1955), Swiss footballer
Cole Sulser (born 1990), American baseball player
Fridolin Sulser (1926–2016), Swiss-American pharmacologist

German-language surnames